This is a list of the operas written by the Italian composer Alessandro Scarlatti (1660–1725).

Scarlatti wrote 45 drammi per musica, also 7 melodrammi, 2 commedia per musica (or opere buffe), 2 opere drammatice, 2 favole boscherecce, 2 tragedie in musica, 1 commedia, 1 dramma pastorale, and 1 dramma sacro per musica.

List

References
Sources

 Boyd, Malcolm (1992), 'Scarlatti, Alessandro' in The New Grove Dictionary of Opera, ed. Stanley Sadie (London) 

 
Lists of operas by composer
Lists of compositions by composer